Twin Town is an unincorporated community located in the towns of Arland and Turtle Lake, Barron County, Wisconsin, United States.

Notes

Unincorporated communities in Barron County, Wisconsin
Unincorporated communities in Wisconsin